Commemorative coins in Poland are special coins minted by the Polish Mint and issued by the National Bank of Poland (the only issuer of the Polish coins  ). Each year several collector and commemorative coins are minted to mark political, historical, scientific, cultural, sporting, humanitarian and other similar events of general importance to Poland or with wider international significance.
The material used for production of the commemorative coins is usually alloy of silver Ag 925, gold Au 900 or pure gold Au 999,9. Most of the commemorative coins have their equivalents in occasional coins of common use, minted from special brass called “Nordic Gold”.

The following table shows the number of coins minted per year. In the first section, the coins are grouped by the metal used, while in the second section they are grouped by their face value.

As a result of inflation in the early 1990s, the currency underwent redenomination. Thus, on 1 January 1995, 10 000 old złotych (PLZ) became one new złoty (PLN). The following list presents commemorative coins since Polish zloty denomination:

Coins issued in 1995
Coins issued in 1996
Coins issued in 1997
Coins issued in 1998
Coins issued in 1999
Coins issued in 2000
Coins issued in 2001
Coins issued in 2002
Coins issued in 2003
Coins issued in 2004
Coins issued in 2005
Coins issued in 2006
Coins issued in 2007
Coins issued in 2008
Coins issued in 2009
Coins issued in 2010

See also

 Numismatics
 Regular issue coinage
 Coin grading

Articles on Polish Wikipedia
 :pl:10 złotych wzór 1975 Adam Mickiewicz
 :pl:10 złotych 1967 Karol Świerczewski
 :pl:10 złotych wzór 1932 Polonia
 :pl:10 złotych 1971 FAO
 :pl:10 złotych 1933 Romuald Traugutt
 :pl:10 złotych wzór 1932 Polonia
 :pl:10 złotych 1933 Jan III Sobieski
 :pl:10 złotych wzór 1934 Józef Piłsudski
 :pl:10 złotych 1934 Józef Piłsudski-Orzeł Strzelecki

References